The FTSE AIM UK 50 Index was introduced on 16 May 2005, and is a market-capitalisation-weighted stock market index. The index incorporates the largest 50 UK companies (by capitalisation) which have their primary listing on the Alternative Investment Market (AIM). It includes UK domiciled companies only. The index is reviewed quarterly, and the constituent companies may change based on market capitalisation data as at the end of February, May, August and November. The index is maintained by FTSE Russell, a subsidiary of the London Stock Exchange Group.

See also
FTSE 100
FTSE 250
FTSE AIM 100 Index

References

British stock market indices
FTSE Group stock market indices